Joseph Carr is a former Ghanaian international goalkeeper. He was named in four Africa Cup of Nations during his career.

He was employed by Real Sociedad as a goalkeeper coach when his playing career was over.

References

External links
 Profile at 11v11

Ghanaian footballers
Ghana international footballers
Living people
Association football goalkeepers
Africa Cup of Nations-winning players
1978 African Cup of Nations players
1980 African Cup of Nations players
1982 African Cup of Nations players
1984 African Cup of Nations players
Year of birth missing (living people)
Association football goalkeeping coaches